Reese Hammond wad a newspaper editor and state legislator in Delaware. He served innthe Delaware House of Representatives. He was a Democrat.

He served with fellow African Americans Oliver F. Fonville and John J. McMahon in the Delaware House. He also served in the House with Ratmond T. Evans, a Republican.

See also
123rd Delaware General Assembly

References

This draft is in progress as of October 18, 2022.

Delaware politicians

Year of birth missing (living people)
Living people